In enzymology, a 8-dimethylallylnaringenin 2'-hydroxylase is an enzyme that catalyzes the chemical reaction

sophoraflavanone B + NADPH + H+ + O2  leachianone G + NADP+ + H2O

The 4 substrates of this enzyme are sophoraflavanone B, NADPH, H+, and O2, whereas its 3 products are leachianone G, NADP+, and H2O.

This enzyme belongs to the family of oxidoreductases, specifically those acting on paired donors, with O2 as oxidant and incorporation or reduction of oxygen. The oxygen incorporated need not be derived from O2 with NADH or NADPH as one donor, and incorporation of one atom o oxygen into the other donor.  The systematic name of this enzyme class is sophoraflavanone-B,NADPH:oxygen oxidoreductase (2'-hydroxylating). This enzyme is also called 8-DMAN 2'-hydroxylase.

References 

 
 

EC 1.14.13
NADPH-dependent enzymes
Enzymes of unknown structure